NBC 5 may refer to one of the following television stations in the United States:

Current

Owned-and-operated stations
KXAS-TV in Dallas/Fort Worth, Texas
WMAQ-TV in Chicago, Illinois

Affiliated stations
KALB-TV in Alexandria, Louisiana
KATH-LD in Juneau, Alaska
KDLV-TV in Mitchell, South Dakota
Simulcast of KDLT-TV in Sioux Falls, South Dakota
KFYR-TV in Bismarck, North Dakota
KGWN-DT2 in Cheyenne, Wyoming
Simulcast of KNEP in Sidney, Nebraska
KING-TV in Seattle/Tacoma, Washington
KOAA-TV in Pueblo/Colorado Springs, Colorado
KOBI in Medford, Oregon
KSCT-LP in Sitka, Alaska
KSDK in Saint Louis, Missouri
KSL-TV in Salt Lake City, Utah
KVZK-5 in Pago Pago, American Samoa
KXGN-DT2 in Glendive, Montana
WCYB-TV in Bristol, Virginia
WLWT in Cincinnati, Ohio
WMC-TV in Memphis, Tennessee
WPTV in West Palm Beach, Florida
WPTZ in Plattsburgh, New York / Burlington, Vermont
WRAL-TV in Raleigh/Durham/Fayetteville, North Carolina

Former
KDLT-TV in Sioux Falls, South Dakota (1983 to 1998)
KHAS-TV in Hastings/Lincoln/Kearney, Nebraska (1956 to 2014)
KNHL in Hastings/Lincoln/Kearney, Nebraska (Analog/DT1 from 1956 to 2014 and DT2 from 2018 to 2022)
Was a simulcast of KSNB-TV in Superior, Nebraska on DT2
KRGV-TV in Weslaco/McAllen/Harlingen/Brownsville, Texas (1954 to 1976)
KSTP-TV in Saint Paul/Minneapolis, Minnesota (1948 to 1979)
WABI-TV in Bangor, Maine (1953 to 1959)
WAVE-TV in Louisville, Kentucky (1948 to 1953; now on channel 3)
WFRV-TV in Green Bay, Wisconsin (1959 to 1983)
WHAM-TV/WROC-TV in Rochester, New York (1954 to 1962)
WNEM-TV in Bay City/Flint/Saginaw, Michigan (1954 to 1995)